The Church of St Andrew the Apostle is the parish church in the village of Bolton upon Dearne in South Yorkshire, England. It is a Church of England church in the Diocese of Sheffield. Additions and alterations include the 14th century chancel and north aisle, a 15th/16th century tower and a 19th-century north chapel and vestry. The church contains memorial plaques for parishioners killed in the First and Second World Wars.

See also
 Grade I listed buildings in South Yorkshire
 Listed buildings in Dearne South

References

External links
The Parish of Goldthorpe and Hickleton

Grade I listed churches in South Yorkshire
Church of England church buildings in South Yorkshire
14th-century church buildings in England